Sparganothoides silaceana is a species of moth of the family Tortricidae. It is found only near Cerro de la Muerte and Poás Volcano in Costa Rica.

The length of the forewings is 9.2–9.9 mm for males and 9.4–10.4 mm for females. The ground colour of the forewings is golden yellow to brownish orange, with scattered pale brownish orange or brown scaling. The hindwings are white. Adults have been recorded on wing in April, May and July, probably in two generations per year.

Etymology
The species name refers to the coloration of the forewings and is derived from Latin silaceus (meaning ochre).

References

Moths described in 2009
Sparganothoides